Song of Songs 4 (abbreviated  as Song 4) is the fourth chapter of the Song of Songs in the Hebrew Bible or the Old Testament of the Christian Bible. This book is one of the Five Megillot, a collection of short books, together with Ruth, Lamentations, Ecclesiastes and Esther, within the Ketuvim, the third and the last part of the Hebrew Bible. Jewish tradition views Solomon as the author of this book (although this is now largely disputed), and this attribution influences the acceptance of this book as a canonical text. This chapter contains the man's descriptive poem of the woman's body and the invitation to be together which is accepted by the woman.

Text
The original text is written in Hebrew language. This chapter is divided into 16 verses.

Textual witnesses
Some early manuscripts containing the text of this chapter in Hebrew are of the Masoretic Text, which includes the Codex Leningradensis (1008). Some fragments containing parts of this chapter were found among the Dead Sea Scrolls: 4Q106 (4QCanta); 30 BCE-30 CE; extant verses 1–7), and 4Q107 (4QCantb); 30 BCE-30 CE; extant verses 1–3, 8–11, 14–16).

There is also a translation into Koine Greek known as the Septuagint, made in the last few centuries BCE. Extant ancient manuscripts of the Septuagint version include Codex Vaticanus (B; B; 4th century), Codex Sinaiticus (S; BHK: S; 4th century), and Codex Alexandrinus (A; A; 5th century).

Structure
The Modern English Version (MEV), along with other translations, sees verses 1 to 15 as the words of the man, and verse 16 as the words of the woman. Athalya Brenner treats verses 1 to 7 as the man's waṣf or descriptive poem, and verse 8 to 5:1 as a dialogue between the male and female lovers.

Analysis

Male: First descriptive poem and call to come along (4:1-8)

The beginning (verse 1a) and the end (verse 8a) of this part contain repeated lines that 'frame an address of endearment': "my darling/[my] bride." Verses 1-7 contain the man's waṣf or descriptive poem of his female lover from head to breast, using imagery of flora and fauna, with a few of 'fortifications and military weapons'. Verses 2 and 5 begin and end this imagery with comparisons with animals, such as sheep and fawns, whereas verses 6-8 focus on the desire of the male speaker to visit "the mountain of myrrh" and to be joined there by his partner, expressing his desire in terms of a sensual pursuit with his lover's body as a mountain on which he finds perfumes.
Verse 7 concludes with a summary statement of the woman's perfection and invitation to his bride to 'come away from the impregnable heights and to join him'.

This waṣf and the later ones (5:10-16; 6:4-10; 7:1-9) demonstrate theologically the heart of the Song, which values the body as not evil but good, even worthy of praise, and respects the body with an appreciative focus (rather than lurid). Hess notes that this reflects 'the fundamental value of God's creation as good and the human body as a key part of that creation, whether at the beginning or redeemed in the resurrection'. While verse 7a is in parallel with verse 1a, forming an inclusio as well as a sense of closure to this part of the poem, verse 7b follows the positive assertion of the woman's beauty with a more negative assertion that "she has no blemish or defect" (mûm; referring to physical imperfection; cf. the use in the sacrificial ritual,), which is similar to the references to Absalom and to Daniel and his three friends in the court of Nebuchadnezzar.

Verse 4
Thy neck is like the tower of David builded for an armoury, whereon there hang a thousand bucklers, all shields of mighty men.
"Tower of David": the actual tower is unknown.
"Bucklers": small shields. The image of the shields and bucklers describe the necklace around the neck of the woman.

Verse 7
Thou art all fair, my love; there is no spot in thee.
"There is no spot": this description is used for the bride of Christ, who is depicted as "not having spot, or wrinkle, or any such thing" (Ephesians 5:27 KJV).

Verse 8
Come with me from Lebanon, my spouse, with me from Lebanon: look from the top of Amana, from the top of Shenir and Hermon, from the lions' dens, from the mountains of the leopards.
This verse depicts the danger and the woman's inaccessibility (cf. Song 2:14). The man is asking his bride not to go with him to Lebanon but to come with him from Lebanon, which is a 'figurative allusion to the general unapproachableness' of the woman. Verse 8b contains two parallel expressions that frame the central expression "from Hermon":
Travel
from the peak of Amana,
from the peak of Senir,
from Hermon,
from the dens of lions
from the mountain lairs of leopards. 
A similar structure in verse 7 forms together the twin centers of "my darling" and "from Mount Hermon", which beautifully summarize the concern of the man for access to his bride.
"Lebanon": located north of Israel in modern-day Lebanon and Syria; Amana, Shenir (or Senir) and Hermon are the names of individual peaks in the Anti-Lebanon mountain ranges.
"Spouse" or "bride" together with "sister" (5:1) are terms of affection.

Male: A walk in the garden (4:9-15)
This section is a part of a dialogue concerning 'seduction and consummation' (until 5:1), where here the man seduces the woman, with extravagant imagery of food and flowers/herbs.

Verse 14
Spikenard and saffron; calamus and cinnamon, with all trees of frankincense; myrrh and aloes, with all the chief spices:
"Saffron, calamus, cinnamon" and "aloes" are spices from India.

Female: Invitation to her garden (4:16)
The woman consents to the man's call (verses 9-15), leading to a closure in 5:1.

Verse 16b

The Vulgate version of the fourth chapter ends on "... " The next phrase, " ..." opens the fifth chapter in the Vulgate version, while most other versions and translations open that chapter with the man's response ("I have come into my garden").

See also
 Anti-Lebanon Mountains
 Lebanon
 Mount Amana
 Mount Gilead
 Mount Hermon

Related Bible parts: Song of Songs 2

Notes

References

Sources

External links
 Jewish translations:
 Shir Hashirim - Song of Songs - Chapter 4 (Judaica Press) translation [with Rashi's commentary] at Chabad.org
 Christian translations:
 Online Bible at GospelHall.org (ESV, KJV, Darby, American Standard Version, Bible in Basic English)
 Song of Solomon Chapter 4 King James Version
  Various versions

04